Thomas Muster was the defending champion, but chose to compete in Stuttgart at the same week.

Francisco Clavet won the title by defeating Juan Albert Viloca 6–4, 7–6(9–7) in the final.

Seeds

Draw

Finals

Top half

Bottom half

References

External links
 Official results archive (ATP)
 Official results archive (ITF)

1997 ATP Tour